Chiang Khian is a tambon (subdistrict) of Thoeng District, in Chiang Rai Province, Thailand. In 2020 it had a total population of 4,277 people.

Administration

Central administration
The tambon is subdivided into 12 administrative villages (muban).

Local administration
The whole area of the subdistrict is covered by the subdistrict municipality (Thesaban Tambon) Chiang Khian (เทศบาลตำบลเชียงเคี่ยน).

References

External links
Thaitambon.com on Chiang Khian

Tambon of Chiang Rai province
Populated places in Chiang Rai province